Spencer Township is a township in Aitkin County, Minnesota, United States. The population was 518 as of the 2010 census.

Geography

The east edge of the city of Aitkin extends into the township, but is a separate entity.

Major highways
  U.S. Highway 169
  Minnesota State Highway 47
  Minnesota State Highway 210

Lakes
 Hanson Lake
 Johnson Lake
 Little Hanson Lake
 Olson Lake
 Sisabagamah Lake (north half)
 Soderman Lakes (northeast quarter)

Adjacent townships
 Morrison Township (north)
 Fleming Township (northeast)
 Kimberly Township (east)
 Glen Township (southeast)
 Nordland Township (south)
 Farm Island Township (southwest)
 Aitkin Township (west)

Cemeteries
The township contains these three cemeteries: Church of the Blessed Virgin, Evergreen and Spencer.

Demographics
As of the census of 2000, there were 602 people, 222 households, and 166 families residing in the township.  The population density was 16.3 people per square mile (6.3/km).  There were 258 housing units at an average density of 7.0/sq mi (2.7/km).  The racial makeup of the township was 97.51% White, 1.16% Native American, 0.33% Asian, 0.17% Pacific Islander, 0.50% from other races, and 0.33% from two or more races. Hispanic or Latino of any race were 0.66% of the population.

There were 222 households, out of which 38.3% had children under the age of 18 living with them, 67.1% were married couples living together, 3.6% had a female householder with no husband present, and 25.2% were non-families. 19.4% of all households were made up of individuals, and 8.1% had someone living alone who was 65 years of age or older.  The average household size was 2.71 and the average family size was 3.11.

In the township the population was spread out, with 28.4% under the age of 18, 5.0% from 18 to 24, 24.8% from 25 to 44, 29.2% from 45 to 64, and 12.6% who were 65 years of age or older.  The median age was 39 years. For every 100 females, there were 102.7 males.  For every 100 females age 18 and over, there were 99.5 males.

The median income for a household in the township was $63,542, and the median income for a family was $73,365. Males had a median income of $77,708 versus $41,875 for females. The per capita income for the township was $37,396.  About 1.6% of families and 3.7% of the population were below the poverty line, including 8.5% of those under age 18 and 8.7% of those age 65 or over.

References
 United States National Atlas
 United States Census Bureau 2007 TIGER/Line Shapefiles
 United States Board on Geographic Names (GNIS)

Townships in Aitkin County, Minnesota
Townships in Minnesota